The Louisiana–Monroe Warhawks women's volleyball team represents the University of Louisiana at Monroe in the sport of volleyball. The Warhawks compete in NCAA Division I and the Sun Belt Conference. The Warhawks play their home matches in Fant–Ewing Coliseum on the university's Monroe, Louisiana campus, and are currently led by head coach Charlie Olson.

Year-by-year results 
<small>

See also
List of NCAA Division I women's volleyball programs

References

External links
 

 
Volleyball clubs established in 1982
1982 establishments in Louisiana